Sette may refer to:

People
Alessandro Sette, Italian immunologist
Giancarlo Sette, Italian astronomer, namesake of the asteroid 8885 Sette
Oscar Elton Sette (1900–1972), American fisheries scientist
Sérgio Sette Câmara (b. 1998), Brazilian race car driver

Fictional characters
Sette Frummagem, the main protagonist of Unsounded

Places
Sette Daban, a mountain range in Russia
Sette Comuni, Cimbria, Veneto, Italy; seven comuni that formed a Cimbrian enclave in the Veneto region of northeast Italy
8885 Sette, the asteroid Sette, the 8885th one registered 
Sette Sale, Oppian Hill, Rome, Italy; a set of cisterns

Other uses
SETTE, the NATO phonetic alphabet representation of "7", from the Italian word for seven
Sette (Claudia Leitte EP), a 2014 extended-play recording by the Brazilian recording artist Claudia Leitte
Sette (magazine), an Italian magazine also known as Corriere della Sera Sette

See also

Sette Bello, American Thoroughbred racehorse
Setté Cama, a village in Gabon
Setté Cama Airport, an airport in Gabon
Setté Cama Hunting Area, a protected area in Gabon
Sette e mezzo, an Italian card game
Sette giorni all'altro mondo, 1936 Italian comedy film
Sette Giugno (7th of June), Maltese national holiday
Sette note in nero, a 1977 Italian giallo film
Sette scialli di seta gialla, a 1972 Italian giallo film
 
 
Sett (disambiguation)
Sete (disambiguation)
Seti (disambiguation)
Set (disambiguation)